Marasmarcha ehrenbergianus is a moth of the family Pterophoridae. It is found in Turkey, Syria, Lebanon, Russia and Iran.

References

Moths described in 1841
Exelastini
Insects of Turkey